Mary DuBois may refer to:
 Mary Ann Delafield DuBois, American sculptor and philanthropist
 Mary Rakowski DuBois, inorganic chemist